Sajid Nawaz Khan (born 25 March 1975) is a Pakistani politician who had been a member of the National Assembly of Pakistan, from June 2013 to May 2018.

Early life and education
Khan was born on 25 March 1975 to politician Haji Mohammad Nawaz.

He holds a degree of Master of Business Administration.

Political career
He joined politics after the death of his father Haji Mohammad Nawaz.

Khan ran for the seat of Provincial Assembly of Khyber Pakhtunkhwa as an independent candidate from Constituency PK-07 (Peshawar-VII) in the 2008 Pakistani general election but was unsuccessful. He secured 2,038 and lost the seat to a candidate of Pakistan Peoples Party.

Khan later joined Pakistan Tehreek-e-Insaf (PTI) and was awarded a PTI ticket to run in 2013 Pakistani general election despite opposition from the PTI chapter in Khyber Pakhtunkhwa. He was elected to the National Assembly of Pakistan as a candidate of PTI from Constituency NA-3 (Peshawar-III) in June 2013 election. He secured 66,528 votes and defeated Haji Ghulam Ali.

References

Living people
Pakistan Tehreek-e-Insaf politicians
Pashtun people
People from Peshawar
Pakistani MNAs 2013–2018
1975 births